Sandy Hill Tavern is a historic inn and tavern located in West Caln Township, Chester County, Pennsylvania.  It was built in 1805–1806, and is a two-story, brick structure measuring 30 feet by 30 feet with Georgian / Federal design elements.  It is four bays by two bays and has a one-story shed roof porch.  It was built expressly as a tavern, but never functioned as such because a license could not be obtained by its owner.

The earliest recorded request for a tavern license was in 1758 when the tavern was known as the General Wolf.  It was twenty years before the tavern was allowed to serve alcohol and the license was granted in 1778.  Over the following twenty years the tavern changed ownership several times and went by a variety of names, changing from the General Wolf, to the Red Horse, and finally becoming the Sandy Hill Tavern. The original wood-framed building was demolished and the brick structure seen today was built in an attempt to reclaim a permit to serve alcohol.  Despite the new construction, the permit was never granted and the Sandy Hill Tavern was never a drinking establishment again.

It was added to the National Register of Historic Places in 1980.

References

Hotel buildings on the National Register of Historic Places in Pennsylvania
Georgian architecture in Pennsylvania
Federal architecture in Pennsylvania
Commercial buildings completed in 1806
Hotel buildings completed in 1806
Buildings and structures in Chester County, Pennsylvania
National Register of Historic Places in Chester County, Pennsylvania
Roadside attractions in Pennsylvania